Caspar Baader (born 1 October 1953) is a Swiss politician, attorney and member of the Swiss National Council from the canton of Basel-Country. Elected in 1998, he is a member of the Swiss People's Party (SVP/UDC).

Baader is married and a father of three.

External links

Personal website

1953 births
Living people
Members of the National Council (Switzerland)
Swiss People's Party politicians
People from Basel-Landschaft